International Journal of Antennas and Propagation is a peer reviewed, scientific open access journal that publishes original and review articles in all areas of antennas and propagation. The editor-in-chief is Slawomir Koziel.

Abstracting and indexing
This journal is abstracted and indexed by the following services
  
Academic Onefile
Aerospace and High Technology Database
Aluminium Industry Abstracts
Current Contents - Engineering, Computing and Technology
EBSCO
Ei Compendex
INSPEC
Science Citation Index
Scopus
Solid State and Superconductivity Abstracts

References

Hindawi Publishing Corporation academic journals
Electrical and electronic engineering journals